Hurricane Carla ranks as the most intense U.S. tropical cyclone landfall on the Hurricane Severity Index. It was the ninth most intense hurricane to make landfall in the U.S. The third named storm of the 1961 Atlantic hurricane season, Carla developed from an area of squally weather in the southwestern Caribbean Sea on September 3. Initially a tropical depression, it strengthened slowly while heading northwestward, and by September 5, the system was upgraded to Tropical Storm Carla. About 24 hours later, Carla was upgraded to a hurricane. Shortly thereafter, the storm curved northward while approaching the Yucatán Channel. Late on September 7, Carla entered the Gulf of Mexico while passing just northeast of the Yucatán Peninsula. By early on the following day, the storm became a major hurricane after reaching Category 3 intensity. Resuming its northwestward course, Carla continued intensification and on September 11, became what would today be classified as a Category 4 hurricane. Later that day, Carla weakened slightly but was still a large and intense hurricane when the storm made landfall near Port O'Connor, Texas. It weakened quickly inland and was reduced to a tropical storm on September 12. Heading generally northward, Carla transitioned into an extratropical cyclone on September 13, while centered over southern Oklahoma. Rapidly moving northeastward, Carla's remnants reached the Labrador Sea, Canada and dissipated on September 17, 1961.

While crossing the Yucatán Channel, the outer bands of Carla brought gusty winds and severe local flooding in western Cuba and the Yucatán Peninsula, though no damage or fatalities were reported. Additionally, several tornadoes spawned in the state caused notable impacts, including a violent F4 tornado near Galveston, Texas, resulting in 200 buildings severely damaged, of which at least 60 were destroyed, 8 deaths and 200 injuries. The aforementioned tornado is one of only two violent tornadoes ever recorded in a hurricane, with wind speeds in the tornado nearly 50% greater than Carla's peak intensity. Throughout the state, Carla destroyed 1,915 homes, 568 farm buildings, and 415 other buildings. Additionally, 50,723 homes, 5,620 farm buildings, and 10,487 other buildings suffered damage. There were 34 fatalities and at least $300 million (1961 USD) in losses in Texas alone. Several tornadoes also touched down in Louisiana, causing the destruction of 140 homes and 11 farms and other buildings, and major damage to 231 additional homes and 11 farm and other buildings. Minor to moderate damage was also reported to 748 homes and 75 farms and other buildings. Six deaths and $25 million in losses in Louisiana were attributed to Carla. Heavy rainfall occurred in several other states, especially in Kansas, where flash flooding severely damaged crops and drowned 5 people. Overall, Carla resulted in $325.74 million in losses and 43 fatalities.

Meteorological history

As early as September 1, a tropical disturbance – an area of convective activity – was observed tracking westward across the Caribbean Sea within the Intertropical Convergence Zone (ITCZ). Around that time, an anticyclone was situated over the western Caribbean Sea at the upper-tropospheric levels. Surface charts indicate that a low-level circulation was developing early on September 3. Initially, the center of circulation remained difficult to locate on surface charts due to lack of data.

It is estimated that sustained winds reached  at 1200 UTC on September 5, thus the depression strengthened into a tropical storm and was named Carla, while located just northeast of Cabo Gracias a Dios. Radars reported an unusually large tropical cyclone, with convective bands extending about  outward from the center. Based on observations obtained by a reconnaissance aircraft at 1100 UTC on September 6 – namely a barometric pressure of  – a bulletin issued by the Weather Bureau an hour later indicated that the storm had "probably reached hurricane intensity". According to post-season analysis, Carla reached hurricane status at that time. 

Shortly after becoming a hurricane on September 6, Carla curved northward in the northwestern Caribbean Sea. At 1200 UTC on September 7, the storm intensified into a Category 2 hurricane while located east-northeast of Cozumel, Quintana Roo, Mexico (actual use of the Saffir-Simpson Hurricane Wind Scale, which was developed in 1971, was not in effect). Shortly thereafter, Carla crossed the Yucatán Channel and entered the Gulf of Mexico. A strong high-pressure area forced Carla to resume its original northwesterly course. Early on September 8, the storm strengthened into a Category 3 hurricane while located just north of the Yucatán Peninsula. Thus, Carla was the third major hurricane of the season. Carla was upgraded to a Category 4 hurricane early on September 10, while approaching the Gulf Coast of the United States. Operationally, at 0000 UTC on September 11, Carla strengthened into a Category 5 hurricane while located in the northwestern Gulf of Mexico.

Carla rapidly weakened inland, and degenerated to a Category 2 hurricane on September 12, while passing just east of Port Lavaca. Six hours later, the storm was downgraded to a Category 1 hurricane near Shiner, shortly before being downgraded to a tropical storm between Taylor and Coupland. Beginning late on September 12, the storm curved just east of due north. After reaching Oklahoma early on September 13, Carla transitioned into an extratropical cyclone while located over rural Johnston County. The extratropical remnants of Carla moved rapidly northeastward and brought heavy rainfall to some areas of the Great Plains and Midwestern United States. By September 14, it entered Canada near Sault Ste. Marie, Ontario. It then continued swiftly northeastward across Ontario, Quebec, and Labrador, before the remnants dissipated over the Labrador Sea on September 17.

Preparations
Occurring a year after Hurricane Donna, officials in the Florida Keys took precautions to brace for potential impact from the storm. The United States Navy flew their planes out of Key West, while Coast Guardsmen evacuated Alligator Reef Light, American Shoal Light, and Sombrero Key Light. Ships docked at Key West sailed out to sea to ride out the squalls. On the morning of September 7, a hurricane watch was issued from the entire coast of Louisiana eastward to Apalachicola, Florida. On September 8, a hurricane watch was issued along the southwest coast of the state from Vermilion Bay westward. It was later extended westward to include the entire coast of Texas, and eastward to Apalachicola, Florida. A portion of the hurricane watch from Aransas Pass, Texas to Grand Isle, Louisiana was upgraded to a hurricane warning at 1600 UTC on September 9. An estimated 500,000 people fled the coasts of Texas and Louisiana, making it the largest evacuation in the history of the United States, at the time. Further, at least half of those people were from Texas. In small towns along the coast of Texas, 90–100% of their populations evacuated, while 20% of people left the larger cities. Many in Galveston stayed due to protection from the Galveston Seawall.

Impact
Carla spawned 21 tornadoes, the largest hurricane-related tornado outbreak on record at the time. However, it was overwhelmingly surpassed by Hurricane Beulah in 1967, which spawned at least 120 tornadoes. Throughout its path, 43 fatalities and about $325.74 million in damage were attributed to Carla. Most of the impact occurred in Texas, where the storm made landfall as a large and strong Category 4 hurricane.

United States

Texas

Because the storm was a Category 4 hurricane at landfall, Carla produced strong winds, especially near its path.

The most significant property damage occurred between Port Arthur and Corpus Christi. Port O'Connor, lying nearest to the location of Carla's landfall, was virtually destroyed. In Columbus, the "Ranch Drive-In" theater is destroyed by the storm and was never reopened after 6 years of operation. About 4,260 homes were damaged, with around 500 severely damaged or destroyed. 43 businesses and 26 public buildings were also significantly impacted. Damage in the city of Victoria reached $10 million. Of the 21 tornadoes spawned by Carla, eight of them in Texas caused significant impact. On September 11, an F2 tornado near Bay City destroyed two radio towers and damaged several buildings. An F3 tornado injured three people and caused the destruction of one house and impacted three others in Jacksonville, resulting in $25,000 in damage. Another F3 tornado in Channelview, located east of Houston, injured 22 people, destroyed 18 homes and six commercial buildings, damaged 40 additional homes, and caused $200,000 in damage. In the early morning hours of September 12, a violent F4 tornado moved across Galveston Island along a 1-mile long, 100-yard-wide path (it crossed into Galveston Bay as well), severely damaging 200 buildings, of which 60-75 were destroyed, and causing eight deaths and 200 injuries. This was the first of only two known violent tornadoes ever spawned by a hurricane with the other one happening during Hurricane Hilda in 1964. A few hours later, an F3 tornado in the area destroyed six houses and extensive, but lesser, damage. In Hardin, another F3 tornado damaged six homes. Several structures sustained impact during yet another F3 tornado in Fulbright. The final tornado occurred during the late afternoon hours of September 13 in Latex. It caused F2 damage, two injuries, and resulted in $2,500 in losses after damaging two houses and three garages.

Then little-known newsman Dan Rather reported live from the weather bureau building in Galveston during the storm, live on-site storm coverage that would be imitated by later reporters. This marked the first live television broadcast of a hurricane. Rather also alerted the public of the size of Carla in a way that "literally changed the way the world sees hurricanes", according to a fellow reporter. Broadcasting live at the Weather Bureau Office in Galveston, Rather asked a meteorologist to outline the Gulf of Mexico on a transparent sheet of plastic. He then held the map over the black and white radar screen, which put the size of Carla into perspective, saying that Carla was the size of the Gulf of Mexico. CBS was so impressed with Rather's work that he was offered the position of correspondent. Throughout Texas, Carla destroyed 1,915 homes, 568 farm buildings, and 415 other buildings. Additionally, 50,723 homes, 5,620 farm buildings, and 10,487 other buildings suffered damage. There were 460 injuries according to the American Red Cross, though the Monthly Weather Review listed a slightly higher number, 465. The storm caused 34 fatalities in Texas. Causes of death include 20 people drowning, eight from tornadoes, four electrocutions, and one heart attack. Overall, damage in the state was "conservatively" estimated at $300 million. A breakdown of damage indicates $200 million incurred to property and $100 million to crops, mostly from unharvested rice and lesser impact to cotton and citrus.

Louisiana
In southeastern Louisiana, abnormally high tides lashed the coast, though no beach erosion was reported. Only minor damage occurred, limited to roofs, glass, and downed tree limbs. The 11 tornadoes spawned by Carla in Louisiana destroyed 140 homes and 11 farm and other buildings, while causing major damage to 231 additional homes and 11 farm and other buildings. Additionally, 748 homes and 75 farm and other buildings suffered minor to moderate damage. Six fatalities and 199 injuries occurred, mostly related to the tornadoes. Damage in Louisiana totaled to about $25 million. A breakdown of losses include $6 million to agriculture, $5 million to buildings, $4 million to boats and beach property, $3 million to roads and bridges, $5 million to oil platforms just offshore, and $2 million in miscellaneous damage.

Oklahoma

Carla and its remnants brought heavy rainfall and strong winds to portions of Oklahoma. About  of rain fell in Grant, Tillman, Washita Counties. Heavier amounts of at least  fell in Atoka and Pushmataha County. Throughout the state, damage in other areas included 90 homes and buildings in Tulsa, 50 homes each in El Reno and Oklahoma City, and 10 homes in Pawnee. Additionally, water inundation washed out several bridges and highways in northeastern parts of the state, leaving roads impassable. Winds injured two people due to airborne debris. Winds and rain combined severely disrupted electrical and telephone services and caused $670,000 in damage, with $600,000 to property and $70,000 to crops.

Illinois
Thus, Carla is the second-wettest tropical cyclone in Illinois, behind only Hurricane Audrey in 1957. Additionally, up to  fell in 24 hours. Severe local flooding occurred, especially in the northern portions of the state. Heavy property and agricultural damage occurred. Streets and basements were reported to have flooded, while bridge approaches and a few small bridges were washed out. After the Chicago River rose , the lock gate to Lake Michigan was opened to release excess water. However, the abrupt onrush of water resulted in about $75,000 in damage to boats at Wilmette Harbor.

Elsewhere in the United States
Winds in Key West reached , while much of Florida reported rainfall from the outer bands of Carla. In Kansas,  of rain in only 6 hours caused flash flooding. Severe crop damage occurred, especially in areas of Chautauqua and Shawnee Counties and to the south of the Kansas River. Many highways were left impassable due to water inundation. A family of 4 drowned after their car was swept off a road near Waverly. A fifth fatality occurred after a car with one occupant was swept into a tributary of the Marmaton River near Fort Scott.

Heavy precipitation also fell in Missouri, especially in Brookfield, Lee's Summit, and Pleasant Hill. One fatality was reported in Missouri, though the cause of death is unknown. Rainfall in Iowa peaked at  near Chariton, making Carla the rainiest tropical cyclone in the state. Regardless, Carla is the wettest tropical cyclone in the history of Michigan. Despite, the rainfall, flooding in Michigan was relatively minimal, limited to a washed out dam in Traverse City. Precipitation in Wisconsin reached  in Brodhead, causing Carla to rank as the wettest tropical cyclone in the state.

Elsewhere
In Cuba, broadcasts reported severe flooding near Pinar del Río, and in Los Colomas and Punta de Cartas. The remnants of Carla brought tropical storm force winds to some areas of Canada. In Ontario, gusty winds caused power outages in the Clarkson–Port Credit area. Winds of  lashed Halifax in Nova Scotia, thus the Halifax Public Gardens closed for threat of falling trees and branches.

Aftermath

Shortly after the storm, Vice President Lyndon B. Johnson, a lifelong resident of Texas, toured the devastation in the state and met with officials from 18 different counties, remarking that "as always, Texans are arising to a challenge... We have suffered hurricane, tornado, and floods, but we in Texas are a bold and brave people." After his report to President John F. Kennedy and Congress, $55 million was approved in aid for Texas, though Kennedy later requested an additional $65 million. President Kennedy issued a disaster declaration for Texas, allowing all jurisdictions in the state to apply for public assistance. The president also declared 6 parishes in Louisiana a disaster area. Helicopters deployed 88 United States Marines to Galveston to patrol devastated areas. A United States Navy task force composed of medical and construction work teams was also sent to the area. Members of the United States National Guard assisted refugees in returning to their homes and worked to prevent looting. Owing to the hurricane's intensity and destruction, the name Carla was retired and will never again be used for an Atlantic hurricane; the name was replaced by Carol in 1965.

See also

 List of tropical cyclones
 List of Atlantic hurricanes
 List of Category 4 Atlantic hurricanes
 Hurricane Harvey (2017) – A Category 4 hurricane that was the most powerful hurricane to hit Texas since Carla; tied for the costliest tropical cyclone ever recorded worldwide

References

External links
 Hurricane Carla radar loop
 NOAA hurricane lists
 NOAA Carla page

Carla
Carla (1961)
Carla (1961)
Carla (1961)
Floods in Texas
1961 in Texas
1961 in Mexico
1961 natural disasters in the United States
September 1961 events in the United States
September 1961 events in North America
September 1961 events in Mexico